Billy the Kid is a 1938 ballet written by the American composer Aaron Copland on commission from Lincoln Kirstein. It was choreographed by Eugene Loring for Ballet Caravan. Along with Rodeo and Appalachian Spring, it is one of Copland's most popular and widely performed pieces. It is most famous for its incorporation of several cowboy tunes and American folk songs and, although built around the figure and the exploits of Billy the Kid, is not so much a biography of a notorious but peculiarly appealing desperado as it is a perception of the "Wild West", in which a figure such as Billy played a vivid role.

It premiered on 16 October 1938 in Chicago by the Ballet Caravan Company, with pianists Arthur Gold and Walter Hendl performing a two-piano version of the score.  The first performance in New York City occurred on 24 May 1939, with an orchestra conducted by Fritz Kitzinger.

Story
The story follows the life of the infamous outlaw Billy the Kid. It begins with "The Open Prairie" and shows many pioneers trekking westward. The action shifts to a small frontier town, in which a young Billy and his mother are present. His mother is killed by a stray bullet during a gunfight and he stabs her killer, then goes on the run.

The next scene shows episodes in Billy's later life. He is living in the desert, is hunted and captured by a posse (in which the ensuing gun battle features prominent percussive effects) and taken to jail. He manages to escape after stealing a gun from the warden during a game of cards and returns to his hideout, where he thinks he is safe, but sheriff Pat Garrett catches up and shoots him to death. The ballet ends with "The Open Prairie" theme and pioneers once again travelling west.

Order of numbers
 Introduction: The Open Prairie
 Street Scene in a Frontier Town
 Mexican Dance and Finale
 Prairie Night (Card Game at Night, Billy and his Sweetheart)
 Gun Battle
 Celebration (After Billy's Capture)
 Billy's Death
 The Open Prairie Again

Music
Cowboy and folk tunes were heavily used, for instance: 
 "Great Grandad"
 "Git Along, Little Dogies"
 "The Old Chisholm Trail"
 "Goodbye Old Paint"

Cover
The eight movements of the ballet make up the first seven tracks of jazz guitarist Bill Frisell's album "Have a Little Faith".

See also
 List of historical ballet characters

Notes

External links
 
 

Ballets by Eugene Loring
Ballets by Aaron Copland
1938 ballet premieres
1938 compositions
Works about Billy the Kid
Cultural depictions of Billy the Kid
Cultural depictions of Pat Garrett
Ballets based on actual events